"Right Here for U" is the third and final single released from 112's 2003 album, Hot & Wet, released as digital download. Q and Slim share lead vocals.

Charts

Weekly charts

References 

2004 singles
112 (band) songs
Bad Boy Records singles
Songs written by Sean Combs
2003 songs